A canapé is a type of hors d'oeuvre, a small, prepared, and often decorative food, consisting of a small piece of bread (sometimes toasted) wrapped or topped with some savoury food, held in the fingers and often eaten in one bite.

Name
The name comes from the French word for sofa, drawing on the analogy that the garnish sits atop the bread as people do on a couch.

Details

Because they are often served during cocktail hours, it is often desired that a canapé be either salty or spicy, in order to encourage guests to drink more. 

A canapé may also be referred to as finger food, although not all finger foods are canapés. Crackers or small slices of bread or toast or puff pastry are cut into various shapes, used as the base for savory butters or pastes, and often topped with other savory foods such as meat, cheese, fish, caviar, foie gras, purées or relish.

Traditionally, canapés are built on stale bread (although other foods such as puff pastry, crackers, or fresh vegetables may be used as a base) cut in thin slices and then shaped with a cutter or knife into circles, rings, squares, strips or triangles.  These are then deep fried, sautéed, or toasted, then topped or piped with highly processed and decoratively applied items. Colorful and eye-pleasing garnishes often complete the presentation. 

The canapés are usually served on a canapé salver and eaten from small canapé plates.

Composition
The composition of a canapé consists of a base (e.g., the bread or pancake), a spread, a main item, and a garnish. 

The spread is traditionally either a compound butter, made by creaming butter with other ingredients such as ham or lobster, or a flavored cream cheese. Mayonnaise salads can also be prepared as spreads. 

Common garnishes can range from finely chopped vegetables, scallions, and herbs to caviar or truffle oil.

According to Lowney's Cook Book (1912):

 "Canapés are made from white, graham, and brown bread, sliced very thin and cut in various shapes. They may be dipped in melted butter, toasted or fried." 

They could be served hot or cold, spread with anchovy, crab or caviar paste, served with garnishes like green and red peppers, paprika, and lemon juice. 

Bread triangles can be sauteed in bacon fat, deep fried, or just buttered and browned in the oven. 

Mustard can be use as a spread for canapés garnished with chopped bacon, grated cheese, or chopped olives.

Example Menus
Example menus & dishes for Canapés can be found below. These are prepared by a selection of private Chefs. 

1. CHEF WIWIN’S ASIAN-FUSION CANAPES MENU EXAMPLE:  
 Marinated kingfish ceviche, raw coconut, coriander, lime
 Asian style prawn cocktails, Australian local prawns, smoked aioli
 Lamb cutlets, greek tzatziki dressing, baby parsley
 Sweet potato, goat cheese, cranberry jam, caramelized walnuts
 Confit heirloom tomatoes, smoked cheese, squid ink waffle
 Japanese matcha pannacotta, seasonal fresh berries

2. CHEF ROBERT’S MEDITERRANEAN EXAMPLE CANAPES MENU:  
 Sydney rock oysters, ponzu, shallots (GF, DF)
 Wagyu beef striploin, enoki mushroom, ginger, coriander (GF, DF)
 Prosciutto Di Parma, balsamic fig, mascarpone, almond wafer (GF)
 Smoked duck breast, apricots and flowers (GF, DF)
 Salmon, cream cheese, puffs
 Chocolate tube, strawberry mousse, mint

3. CHEF SAILESH’S MODERN AUSTRALIAN EXAMPLE CANAPES MENU:  
 Pork belly slider, pickled fennel slaw (DF)
 Gin cured salmon, blini, dill, cream cheese
 Moroccan lamb ribs, yoghurt dressing (GF)
 Caramelised onion shell, triple brie (V)
 Avocado, feta mousse, crostini (V)
 Lemon curd, tart, raspberry powder, merengue (V)

See also

 Amuse-bouche
 Antipasto
 Hors d'œuvre
 List of hors d'oeuvre
 Meze
 Tapas
 Tea sandwich
 Vol-au-vent
 Zakuski

References

External links
 

Appetizers
Bread dishes